François Picard (26 April 1921, Villefranche-sur-Saône, Rhône – 29 April 1996, Nice) was a racing driver from France. He participated in one Formula One Grand Prix, on 19 October 1958.  He scored no championship points. This race was his last, as he crashed his Cooper into Olivier Gendebien's Ferrari, which had spun in front of him, and Picard suffered serious injuries. He eventually recovered, but never raced again.

Complete Formula One results
(key)

References

1921 births
1996 deaths
Sportspeople from Villefranche-sur-Saône
French racing drivers
French Formula One drivers
Rob Walker Racing Team Formula One drivers
24 Hours of Le Mans drivers
World Sportscar Championship drivers

12 Hours of Reims drivers